Top Rank, Inc. is a boxing promotional company founded by Jabir Herbert Muhammad and Bob Arum, which was incorporated in 1973, and is based in Las Vegas, Nevada.

Since its founding, Top Rank has promoted many world class fighters, including Muhammad Ali, Alexis Argüello, Oscar De La Hoya, Roberto Durán, Joe Frazier, George Foreman, Marvin Hagler, Juan Manuel Marquez, Manny Pacquiao, Sugar Ray Leonard, Floyd Mayweather Jr., Erik Morales, Thomas Hearns, Paulie Ayala, Iran Barkley, Michael Carbajal, Larry Holmes, Ray Mancini, Carlos Monzón, Terry Norris, Gabriel Ruelas, Rafael Ruelas, James Toney, Kubrat Pulev, Guido Vianello and Tyson Fury.

The company has promoted such superfights as Hagler vs Leonard, Chavez vs De La Hoya, Holyfield vs Foreman, Foreman vs Moorer, Leonard vs Hearns, Hagler vs Hearns, Ali vs Frazier II and both Ali vs Spinks fights. The company also promoted George Foreman's comeback to regain the world championship, culminating in the knockout of then IBF/WBA champion Michael Moorer on November 5, 1994.

History

Main Bout
The precursor to Top Rank was Main Bout, a company founded by Muhammad Ali in 1966 to promote his fights. Along with Muhammad Ali, other early equity owners of the company included Jabir Herbert Muhammad, Bob Arum, and John Ali (chief aide to Nation of Islam leader Elijah Muhammad). The company was founded after the Muhammad Ali vs. Floyd Patterson fight, and the company mainly handled Ali's boxing promotions and pay-per-view closed-circuit television broadcasts in the late 1960s. The company's stockholders included several other fellow Nation of Islam members.

Top Rank Boxing on ESPN
In the early 1980s, Top Rank Boxing and then-fledgling ESPN formed a partnership to bring a weekly boxing to the cable network which culminated with the first regularly televised boxing series since 1964. The first event was held on April 10, 1980, in Atlantic City, when middleweight Frank Fletcher decisioned Ben Serrano. The original Top Rank Boxing on ESPN was the longest-running cable series and weekly boxing series in history, after celebrating its 16th consecutive year in 1996. ESPN broke away from the contract afterward, replacing it with Friday Night Fights—a new series that would feature fights from other promotions and aired on ESPN2.

In July 2017, Top Rank began to soft launch a new broadcasting agreement with ESPN, beginning with Manny Pacquiao vs. Jeff Horn, followed by two more cards in August. That month, ESPN officially announced a multi-year agreement, calling for events airing across ESPN linear and digital properties (including its recently-launched subscription service ESPN+), and an option to carry events on pay-per-view. On August 2, 2018, ESPN extended the agreement through 2025.

Announcers
Kenneth Anderson AKA (Mr. Kennedy Aka Mr. Anderson)

Blow-by-blow
Sal Marchiano (1980–1983)
Sam Rosen (1983–1986)
Al Bernstein (1986–1996)
Don Chevrier (1987–1988)
Tom Kelly (1988–1989)
Barry Tompkins (1989–1994)
Bob Papa (1996–2003)
Joe Tessitore (2003–present)

Color Commentator
Al Bernstein (1980–1986, 1987–1998)
Tommy Hearns (1980)
Randy Gordon (1980–1982)
Donald Curry (1985)
Dave Bontempo (1986–1998)
Teddy Atlas (1998–2017)
Andre Ward (2017–present)
Mark Kriegel (2017–present)
Timothy Bradley (2020–present)

Current boxers

Notable fighters

Muhammad Ali
Mikey Garcia
Mike Alvarado
Jorge Arce
Urbano Antillon
José Benavidez
Timothy Bradley
Iván Calderón
José Luis Castillo
Martín Castillo
Julio César Chávez Jr
Omar Chávez
Joshua Clottey
Bernabe Concepcion
Terence Crawford
Kid Diamond
David Díaz
Nonito Donaire
Esquiva Falcão
Yuri Foreman
Yuriorkis Gamboa
Miguel Angel Garcia
Kendall Holt
Demetrius Hopkins
Miguel Angel Huerta
Nobuhiro Ishida
Jesus Soto Karass
Vasiliy Lomachenko
Juan Manuel Lopez
Francisco Lorenzo
Steven Luevano

Antonio Margarito
Raul Martinez
Vanes Martirosyan
Egor Mekhontsev
Fernando Montiel
Tommy Morrison
Ryota Murata
Manny Pacquiao
Arnold Barboza Jr.
Kelly Pavlik
Anthony Peterson
Lamont Peterson
Hasim Rahman
Brandon Rios
Marco Antonio Rubio
Andy Ruiz
Mario Santiago
Giovanni Segura
Jorge Solís
Ulises Solís
Glen Tapia
Anthony Thompson
Ricardo Torres
Brian Viloria
José Luis Zertuche
Shiming Zou

Other events
Early in its history, Top Rank promoted the Snake River Canyon jump of daredevil Evel Knievel in September 1974. The event, at Twin Falls, Idaho, was shown live on paid closed circuit television in hundreds of theaters, for about ten dollars each. The steam-powered Skycycle X-2 had a premature deployment of its parachute and Knievel survived.

References

External links

 

Boxing promoters
ESPN original programming
Boxing television series
1980 American television series debuts
1996 American television series endings
2017 American television series debuts
1980s American television series
1990s American television series
2000s American television series
2010s American television series
2020s American television series
Companies based in Paradise, Nevada
Entertainment companies established in 1973
American companies established in 1973
Sports event promotion companies
1973 establishments in Nevada